Calliostoma levibasis is a species of sea snail, a marine gastropod mollusk in the family Calliostomatidae.

Notes
Additional information regarding this species:
 Taxonomic remark: Some authors place this taxon in the subgenus Calliostoma (Tristichotrochus).

References

External links
 To Encyclopedia of Life
 To World Register of Marine Species

levibasis
Gastropods described in 1971